Arga Makmur is a town, district and the seat of North Bengkulu Regency in Bengkulu province, Indonesia. Its population is 47,457.

Climate
Arga Makmur has a tropical rainforest climate (Af) with heavy to very heavy rainfall year-round.

References

North Bengkulu Regency
Regency seats of Bengkulu